In South Asia, five countries have parliamentary governments, including Bangladesh, Bhutan, India, Nepal and Pakistan. Of these, three are federal republics (India, Nepal and Pakistan), one is a unitary republic (Bangladesh) and one is a constitutional monarchy (Bhutan). Two South Asian countries, the Maldives and Sri Lanka, have either presidential (Maldives) or semi-presidential (Sri Lanka) governments which are accountable to elected legislatures; and both are unitary states.

South Asia is the world's most populous region among constitutional democratic republics, with over 1 billion people living under democratic systems, compared to populations of 500 million people in the European Union, North America or South America. The three core countries of the Indian subcontinent, including Bangladesh, India and Pakistan, began their modern democratic experiment as part of the British Indian Empire, particularly with the legislatures of British India. Sri Lanka is the oldest democracy in Asia in terms of universal suffrage, which was granted by the Donoughmore Constitution in 1931. Today, fundamental rights are enshrined in the constitutions of all South Asian countries.

The vast expanse of subnational units in India and Pakistan share a common feature of parliamentary government. All the 28 states of India and 4 provinces of Pakistan are governed by legislatures. Despite the extensive democratic framework, there are significant deficits and challenges to democracy, including human rights abuses, militarism and authoritarianism. Moreover, there is little cooperation between parliaments in the region. The state and provincial governments of India and Pakistan hardly have engagement with neighboring countries like Bangladesh, Sri Lanka and Nepal. Regional and local governments in unitary countries like Bangladesh and Sri Lanka also lack relations with regional counterparts in their neighboring countries.

Afghanistan
Leadership Council

Bangladesh
Parliament of Bangladesh

Bhutan
Parliament of Bhutan
National Council of Bhutan
National Assembly of Bhutan

India

Federal Legislature
Parliament of India
Rajya Sabha
Lok Sabha

State Legislatures
Andhra Pradesh Legislature
Andhra Pradesh Legislative Council
Andhra Pradesh Legislative Assembly
Arunachal Pradesh Legislative Assembly
Assam Legislative Assembly
Bihar Legislature
Bihar Legislative Council
Bihar Legislative Assembly
Chhattisgarh Legislative Assembly
Goa Legislative Assembly
Gujarat Legislative Assembly
Haryana Legislative Assembly
Himachal Pradesh Legislative Assembly
Jharkhand Legislative Assembly
Karnataka Legislature
Karnataka Legislative Council
Karnataka Legislative Assembly
Kerala Legislative Assembly
Madhya Pradesh Legislative Assembly
Maharashtra Legislature
Maharashtra Legislative Council
Maharashtra Legislative Assembly
Manipur Legislative Assembly
Meghalaya Legislative Assembly
Mizoram Legislative Assembly
Nagaland Legislative Assembly
Odisha Legislative Assembly
Punjab Legislative Assembly
Rajasthan Legislative Assembly
Sikkim Legislative Assembly
Tamil Nadu Legislative Assembly
Telangana Legislature
Telangana Legislative Council
Telangana Legislative Assembly
Tripura Legislative Assembly
Uttar Pradesh Legislature
Uttar Pradesh Legislative Council
Uttar Pradesh Legislative Assembly
Uttarakhand Legislative Assembly
West Bengal Legislative Assembly

Union Territory Legislatures
Delhi Legislative Assembly
Jammu and Kashmir Legislative Assembly
Puducherry Legislative Assembly

Maldives
People's Majlis

Nepal

Federal Legislature
Parliament of Nepal
Rastriya Sabha
Pratinidhi Sabha

Provincial Legislatures
Provincial Assembly of Province No. 1	
Provincial Assembly of Madhesh Province	
Provincial Assembly of Bagmati Pradesh
Provincial Assembly of Gandaki Pradesh
Provincial Assembly of Lumbini Province
Provincial Assembly of Karnali Pradesh
Provincial Assembly of Sudurpashchim Pradesh

Pakistan

Federal Legislature
Parliament of Pakistan
Senate of Pakistan
National Assembly of Pakistan

Provincial Legislatures
Provincial Assembly of Balochistan
Khyber Pakhtunkhwa Assembly
Provincial Assembly of Punjab
Provincial Assembly of Sindh

Extra-constitutionally administered Territory Legislatures
Azad Kashmir Legislative Assembly
Gilgit-Baltistan Legislative Assembly

Sri Lanka
Parliament of Sri Lanka

See also
List of legislatures

References

South Asia
India politics-related lists
Politics of Afghanistan
Politics of Bangladesh
Politics of Pakistan
Politics of Sri Lanka
Politics of Nepal
Politics of the Maldives
Politics of Bhutan
South Asia